Ray Hester (March 31, 1949 – May 15, 1977) was a professional American football player who played linebacker for the New Orleans Saints from 1971 to 1973, and The Hawaiians of the WFL in 1974. He was diagnosed with leukemia in 1975.  He died from leukemia at the age of 28.

References

1949 births
1977 deaths
American football linebackers
Deaths from cancer in Louisiana
Deaths from leukemia
New Orleans Saints players
Tulane Green Wave football players
The Hawaiians players